The James Deans is a book written by Reed Farrel Coleman and published by Plume on 25 January 2005, which later went on to win the Anthony Award for Best Paperback Original in 2006.

The mystery novel follows the life of the fictional character, Moe Prager, a former NYPD cop turned P.I., as he is forced to uncover the truth regarding the unsolved case of a missing female intern.

References 

Anthony Award-winning works
American mystery novels
2005 American novels